Bo Suak is a tambon (subdistrict) of Mueang Nan District, Nan Province, northern Thailand. In 2018 it had a total population of 6,579 people.

History
Bo Suak has a history of more than 750 years, it was a border town of the eastern Lanna Kingdom. There is a folklore that here was the residence of the Lua people, and it is a location of sacred salt well called "Bo Suak" (refers to "salt"). Currently, it is located in the middle of the rice fields, divided into two wells are Bo Kluea Nuea (บ่อเกลือเหนือ) and Bo Kluea Tai (บ่อเกลือใต้).

In the year 1999, there were excavations found in seven ancient pottery kilns at the house of a local noncommissioned policeman. The kilns face Chao Phraya River for transport conveniently. They are the same era potteries as the Sangkhalok ceramic ware of Sukhothai Kingdom.

Originally, the area was called just "Suak". It was renamed Bo Suak in 2010 for auspiciousness.

Geography
Bo Suak  has a total area of 61.510 km2 (23.74914 mi²).

Neighboring tambons are (from the north clockwise): Rueang, Chai Sathan, and Du Tai, Na Sao, and Mae Khaning of Wiang Sa District.

Administration

Central administration
The tambon is subdivided into ten administrative mubans (villages)

Local administration
The area of the tambon is shared by local government.

the subdistrict administrative organization (SAO) Bo Suak (องค์การบริหารส่วนตำบลบ่อสวก)

Local products
Pottery
Traditional hand-woven fabric
Earthen steamer

References

External links
 Website of Bosuak subdistrict administrative organization

Tambon of Nan Province